Crotogoudin is a cytotoxic diterpene compound derived from the Madagascan croton plant from which crotobarin was similarly isolated. In in vitro studies, it showed antiproliferative activity against various human cancer cell lines.

References 

Diterpenes
Lactones
Vinylidene compounds